Old Newton with Dagworth is a civil parish in the Mid Suffolk district of Suffolk in eastern England. The parish contains the village of Old Newton, as well as the hamlets of Brown Street, Dagworth and Ward Green. In 2005 its population was 1,050. The parish shares a parish council with neighbouring Gipping.

References

External links
Old Newton with Dagworth and Gipping Parish Council
A History of Dagworth

Civil parishes in Suffolk
Mid Suffolk District